Myrtales is an order of flowering plants placed within the eurosids by the APG III system of classification for angiosperms. This finding is corroborated by the placement of the Myrtales in the Malvid clade by the One Thousand Plant Transcriptomes Initiative.
The anthophytes are a grouping of plant taxa bearing flower-like reproductive structures. They were formerly thought to be a clade comprising plants bearing flower-like structures.  The group contained the angiosperms - the extant flowering plants, such as roses and grasses - as well as the Gnetales and the extinct Bennettitales.

23,420 species of vascular plant have been recorded in South Africa, making it the sixth most species-rich country in the world and the most species-rich country on the African continent. Of these, 153 species are considered to be threatened. Nine biomes have been described in South Africa: Fynbos, Succulent Karoo, desert, Nama Karoo, grassland, savanna, Albany thickets, the Indian Ocean coastal belt, and forests.

The 2018 South African National Biodiversity Institute's National Biodiversity Assessment plant checklist lists 35,130 taxa in the phyla Anthocerotophyta (hornworts (6)), Anthophyta (flowering plants (33534)), Bryophyta (mosses (685)), Cycadophyta (cycads (42)), Lycopodiophyta (Lycophytes(45)), Marchantiophyta (liverworts (376)), Pinophyta (conifers (33)), and Pteridophyta (cryptogams (408)).

Ten families are represented in the literature. Listed taxa include species, subspecies, varieties, and forms as recorded, some of which have subsequently been allocated to other taxa as synonyms, in which cases the accepted taxon is appended to the listing. Multiple entries under alternative names reflect taxonomic revision over time.

Combretaceae
Family: Combretaceae,

Combretum
Genus Combretum:
 Combretum apiculatum Sond. indigenous
 Combretum apiculatum Sond. subsp. apiculatum, indigenous
 Combretum bracteosum (Hochst.) Engl. & Diels, endemic
 Combretum caffrum (Eckl. & Zeyh.) Kuntze, endemic
 Combretum celastroides Welw. ex M.A.Lawson subsp. orientale Exell, accepted as Combretum celastroides Welw. ex M.A.Lawson subsp. celastroides, indigenous
 Combretum collinum Fresen. indigenous
 Combretum collinum Fresen. subsp. gazense (Swynn. & Baker f.) Okafor, indigenous
 Combretum collinum Fresen. subsp. suluense (Engl. & Diels) Okafor, indigenous
 Combretum collinum Fresen. subsp. taborense (Engl.) Okafor, indigenous
 Combretum edwardsii Exell, endemic
 Combretum erythrophyllum (Burch.) Sond. indigenous
 Combretum hereroense Schinz, indigenous
 Combretum hereroense Schinz subsp. hereroense, indigenous
 Combretum imberbe Wawra, indigenous
 Combretum kraussii Hochst. indigenous
 Combretum microphyllum Klotzsch, indigenous
 Combretum mkuzense J.D.Carr & Retief, endemic
 Combretum moggii Exell, endemic
 Combretum molle R.Br. ex G.Don, indigenous
 Combretum mossambicense (Klotzsch) Engl. indigenous
 Combretum nelsonii Dummer, endemic
 Combretum padoides Engl. & Diels, indigenous
 Combretum petrophilum Retief, endemic
 Combretum stylesii O.Maurin, Jordaan & A.E.van Wyk, indigenous
 Combretum tenuipes Engl. & Diels, endemic
 Combretum vendae A.E.van Wyk, endemic
 Combretum vendae A.E.van Wyk var. glabratum N.Hahn, endemic
 Combretum vendae A.E.van Wyk var. vendae, endemic
 Combretum woodii Dummer, indigenous
 Combretum zeyheri Sond. indigenous

Lumnitzera
Genus Lumnitzera:
 Lumnitzera racemosa Willd. indigenous
 Lumnitzera racemosa Willd. var. racemosa, indigenous

Pteleopsis
Genus Pteleopsis:
 Pteleopsis myrtifolia (M.A.Lawson) Engl. & Diels, indigenous

Quisqualis
Genus Quisqualis:
 Quisqualis parviflora Gerrard ex Sond. endemic

Terminalia
Genus Terminalia:
 Terminalia brachystemma Welw. ex Hiern, indigenous
 Terminalia brachystemma Welw. ex Hiern subsp. brachystemma, indigenous
 Terminalia phanerophlebia Engl. & Diels, indigenous
 Terminalia prunioides M.A.Lawson, indigenous
 Terminalia sericea Burch. ex DC. indigenous

Heteropyxidaceae
Family: Heteropyxidaceae,

Heteropyxis
Genus Heteropyxis:
 Heteropyxis canescens Oliv. indigenous
 Heteropyxis dehniae Suess. indigenous
 Heteropyxis natalensis Harv. indigenous

Lythraceae
Family: Lythraceae,

Ammannia
Genus Ammannia:
 Ammannia auriculata Willd.  not indigenous, naturalised
 Ammannia auriculata Willd. var. auriculata, not indigenous, naturalised
 Ammannia baccifera L.  not indigenous, naturalised
 Ammannia baccifera L. subsp. baccifera, not indigenous, naturalised
 Ammannia prieuriana Guill. & Perr. indigenous
 Ammannia pusilla Sond. accepted as Ammannia prieuriana Guill. & Perr.  present
 Ammannia senegalensis Lam. indigenous

Cuphea
Genus Cuphea:
 Cuphea ignea A.DC.  not indigenous, cultivated, naturalised
 Cuphea micropetala Humb. Bonpl. & Kunth,  not indigenous, cultivated, naturalised

Galpinia
Genus Galpinia:
 Galpinia transvaalica N.E.Br. indigenous

Heimia
Genus Heimia:
 Heimia myrtifolia Cham. & Schltdl.  not indigenous, naturalised, invasive
 Heimia salicifolia (Humb. Bonpl. & Kunth) Link & Otto,  not indigenous, cultivated, naturalised

Lagerstroemia
Genus Lagerstroemia:
 Lagerstroemia indica L.  not indigenous, cultivated, naturalised, invasive
 Lagerstroemia speciosa (L.) Pers.  not indigenous, cultivated, naturalised

Lythrum
Genus Lythrum:
 Lythrum hyssopifolia L.  not indigenous, naturalised, invasive
 Lythrum salicaria L.  not indigenous, naturalised, invasive

Nesaea
Genus Nesaea:
 Nesaea alata Immelman, indigenous
 Nesaea anagalloides (Sond.) Koehne, indigenous
 Nesaea cordata Hiern, indigenous
 Nesaea crassicaulis (Guill. & Perr.) Koehne, indigenous
 Nesaea cymosa Immelman, indigenous
 Nesaea dinteri Koehne, indigenous
 Nesaea dinteri Koehne subsp. elata A.Fern. indigenous
 Nesaea drummondii A.Fern. indigenous
 Nesaea heptamera Hiern, indigenous
 Nesaea passerinoides (Welw. ex Hiern) Koehne, indigenous
 Nesaea radicans Guill. & Perr. indigenous
 Nesaea radicans Guill. & Perr. var. floribunda (Sond.) A.Fern. indigenous
 Nesaea rigidula (Sond.) Koehne, indigenous
 Nesaea sagittifolia (Sond.) Koehne, indigenous
 Nesaea sagittifolia (Sond.) Koehne var. ericiformis Koehne forma ericiformis, endemic
 Nesaea sagittifolia (Sond.) Koehne var. ericiformis Koehne forma swaziensis, indigenous
 Nesaea sagittifolia (Sond.) Koehne var. sagittifolia, indigenous
 Nesaea schinzii Koehne, indigenous
 Nesaea schlechteri A.Fern. indigenous
 Nesaea tolypobotrys Koehne, endemic
 Nesaea wardii Immelman, endemic
 Nesaea woodii Koehne, endemic
 Nesaea zambatidis Immelman, indigenous

Punica
Genus Punica:
 Punica granatum L.  not indigenous, cultivated, naturalised

Rotala
Genus Rotala:
 Rotala capensis (Harv.) A.Fern. & Diniz, indigenous
 Rotala filiformis (Bellardi) Hiern, indigenous
 Rotala mexicana Cham. & Schltdl.  not indigenous, naturalised
 Rotala tenella (Guill. & Perr.) Hiern, indigenous

Trapa
Genus Trapa:
 Trapa natans L. indigenous
 Trapa natans L. var. pumila Nakano ex Verdc. indigenous

Melastomataceae
Family: Melastomataceae,

Antherotoma
Genus Antherotoma:
 Antherotoma debilis (Sond.) Jacq.-Fel. indigenous
 Antherotoma naudinii Hook.f. indigenous
 Antherotoma phaeotricha (Hochst.) Jacq.-Fel. indigenous

Dissotis
Genus Dissotis:
 Dissotis canescens (E.Mey. ex R.A.Graham) Hook.f. indigenous
 Dissotis debilis (Sond.) Triana, accepted as Antherotoma debilis (Sond.) Jacq.-Fel.  present
 Dissotis debilis (Sond.) Triana var. lanceolata (Cogn.) A.Fern. & R.Fern. accepted as Antherotoma debilis (Sond.) Jacq.-Fel. 
 Dissotis phaeotricha (Hochst.) Hook.f. accepted as Antherotoma phaeotricha (Hochst.) Jacq.-Fel.  present
 Dissotis princeps (Kunth) Triana, indigenous
 Dissotis princeps (Kunth) Triana var. candolleana (Cogn.) A.Fern. & R.Fern. indigenous
 Dissotis princeps (Kunth) Triana var. princeps, indigenous

Heterocentron
Genus Heterocentron:
 Heterocentron macrostachyum Naudin,  not indigenous, naturalised
 Heterocentron subtriplinervium (Link & Otto) A.Braun & C.D.Bouche,  not indigenous, naturalised

Melastoma
Genus Melastoma:
 Melastoma malabathricum L.  not indigenous, naturalised, invasive

Pleroma
Genus Pleroma:
 Pleroma granulosum (Desr.) D.Don (syn. Tibouchina granulosa) not indigenous, cultivated, naturalised
 Pleroma urvilleanum (DC.) P.J.F.Guim. & Michelang. (syn. Tibouchina urvilleana) not indigenous, cultivated, naturalised

Memecylaceae
Family: Memecylaceae,

Memecylon
Genus Memecylon:
 Memecylon bachmannii Engl. endemic
 Memecylon natalense Markgr. endemic
 Memecylon sousae A.Fern. & R.Fern. accepted as Warneckea sousae (A.Fern. & R.Fern.) A.E.van Wyk,  present

Warneckea
Genus Warneckea:
 Warneckea parvifolia R.D.Stone & Ntetha, endemic
 Warneckea sousae (A.Fern. & R.Fern.) A.E.van Wyk, indigenous

Myrtaceae
Family: Myrtaceae,

Agonis
Genus Agonis:
 Agonis flexuosa (Spreng.) Schauer,  not indigenous, cultivated, naturalised

Baeckea
Genus Baeckea:
 Baeckea africana Burm.f. accepted as Brunia africana (Burm.f.) Class.-Bockh. & E.G.H.Oliv. endemic
 Baeckea cordata Burm.f. accepted as Brunia cordata (Burm.f.) Class.-Bockh. & E.G.H.Oliv. indigenous

Callistemon
Genus Callistemon:
 Callistemon citrinus (Curtis) Skeels, accepted as Melaleuca citrina (Curtis) Dum.Cours.  not indigenous, naturalised, invasive
 Callistemon rigidus R.Br. accepted as Melaleuca linearis Schrad. & J.C.Wendl. var. linearis, not indigenous, naturalised, invasive
 Callistemon rugulosus (Schltdl. ex Link) DC. accepted as Melaleuca rugulosa (Schltdl. ex Link) Craven 
 Callistemon speciosus (Sims) DC. accepted as Melaleuca glauca (Sweet) Craven,  not indigenous, naturalised
 Callistemon viminalis (Sol. ex Gaertn.) G.Don, accepted as Melaleuca viminalis (Sol. ex Gaertn.) Byrnes subsp. viminalis, not indigenous, naturalised, invasive

Calothamnus
Genus Calothamnus:
 Calothamnus pinifolius F.Muell. accepted as Melaleuca peucophylla Craven & R.D.Edwards

Corymbia
Genus Corymbia:
 Corymbia citriodora (Hook.) K.D.Hill & L.A.S.Johnson,  not indigenous, cultivated, naturalised
 Corymbia ficifolia (F.Muell.) K.D.Hill & L.A.S.Johnson,  not indigenous, cultivated, naturalised, invasive

Eucalyptus
Genus Eucalyptus:
 Eucalyptus botryoides Sm.  not indigenous, cultivated, naturalised, invasive
 Eucalyptus camaldulensis Dehnh.  not indigenous, cultivated, naturalised, invasive
 Eucalyptus citriodora Hook. accepted as Corymbia citriodora (Hook.) K.D.Hill & L.A.S.Johnson,  not indigenous, cultivated, naturalised
 Eucalyptus cladocalyx F.Muell.  not indigenous, cultivated, naturalised, invasive
 Eucalyptus conferruminata D.J.Carr & S.G.M.Carr,  not indigenous, cultivated, naturalised, invasive
 Eucalyptus diversicolor F.Muell.  not indigenous, cultivated, naturalised, invasive
 Eucalyptus globulus Labill. subsp. maidenii (F.Muell.) Kirkp.  not indigenous, cultivated, naturalised
 Eucalyptus gomphocephala DC.  not indigenous, cultivated, naturalised, invasive
 Eucalyptus grandis W.Hill ex Maiden,  not indigenous, cultivated, naturalised, invasive
 Eucalyptus longifolia Link & Otto,  not indigenous, naturalised
 Eucalyptus microcorys F.Muell.  not indigenous, cultivated, naturalised, invasive
 Eucalyptus microtheca F.Muell.  not indigenous, naturalised
 Eucalyptus regnans F.Muell.  not indigenous, naturalised
 Eucalyptus sideroxylon A.Cunn. ex Woolls,  not indigenous, cultivated, naturalised, invasive
 Eucalyptus tereticornis Sm.  not indigenous, cultivated, naturalised, invasive

Eugenia
Genus Eugenia:
 Eugenia albanensis Sond. endemic
 Eugenia capensis (Eckl. & Zeyh.) Sond. indigenous
 Eugenia capensis (Eckl. & Zeyh.) Sond. subsp. a, indigenous
 Eugenia capensis (Eckl. & Zeyh.) Sond. subsp. capensis, indigenous
 Eugenia capensis (Eckl. & Zeyh.) Sond. subsp. gueinzii (Sond.) F.White, endemic
 Eugenia erythrophylla Strey, endemic
 Eugenia gueinzii Sond. accepted as Eugenia capensis (Eckl. & Zeyh.) Sond. subsp. gueinzii (Sond.) F.White,  present
 Eugenia mossambicensis Engl. accepted as Eugenia capensis (Eckl. & Zeyh.) Sond. subsp. a, present
 Eugenia natalitia Sond. indigenous
 Eugenia pusilla N.E.Br. endemic
 Eugenia simii Dummer, endemic
 Eugenia umtamvunensis A.E.van Wyk, endemic
 Eugenia uniflora L.  not indigenous, naturalised, invasive
 Eugenia verdoorniae A.E.van Wyk, endemic
 Eugenia woodii Dummer, indigenous
 Eugenia zeyheri (Harv.) Harv. endemic
 Eugenia zuluensis Dummer, endemic

Leptospermum
Genus Leptospermum:
 Leptospermum continentale Joy Thomps.  not indigenous, naturalised
 Leptospermum laevigatum (Gaertn.) F.Muell.  not indigenous, naturalised, invasive
 Leptospermum micromyrtus Miq.  not indigenous, naturalised
 Leptospermum scoparium J.R.Forst. & G.Forst.  not indigenous, naturalised, invasive
 Leptospermum squarrosum Gaertn.  not indigenous, cultivated, naturalised

Melaleuca
Genus Melaleuca:
 Melaleuca armillaris (Sol. ex Gaertn.) Sm.  not indigenous, cultivated, naturalised
 Melaleuca armillaris (Sol. ex Gaertn.) Sm. subsp. armillaris, not indigenous, cultivated, naturalised, invasive
 Melaleuca citrina (Curtis) Dum.Cours.  not indigenous, cultivated, naturalised, invasive
 Melaleuca cruenta Craven & R.D.Edwards,  not indigenous, naturalised
 Melaleuca diosmifolia Andrews,  not indigenous, cultivated, naturalised
 Melaleuca elliptica Labill.  not indigenous, cultivated, naturalised
 Melaleuca hypericifolia Sm.  not indigenous, cultivated, naturalised, invasive
 Melaleuca linearis Schrad. & J.C.Wendl. var. linearis, not indigenous, cultivated, naturalised, invasive
 Melaleuca nesophila F.Muell.  not indigenous, cultivated, naturalised
 Melaleuca parvistaminea Byrnes,  not indigenous, naturalised, invasive
 Melaleuca peucophylla Craven & R.D.Edwards,  not indigenous, naturalised
 Melaleuca quadrifida (R.Br.) Craven & R.D.Edwards subsp. quadrifida, not indigenous, naturalised
 Melaleuca quinquenervia (Cav.) S.T.Blake,  not indigenous, cultivated, naturalised, invasive
 Melaleuca rugulosa (Schltdl. ex Link) Craven,  not indigenous, cultivated, naturalised, invasive
 Melaleuca salicina Craven,  not indigenous, cultivated, naturalised
 Melaleuca styphelioides Sm.  not indigenous, cultivated, naturalised
 Melaleuca subulata (Cheel) Craven,  not indigenous, naturalised
 Melaleuca viminalis (Sol. ex Gaertn.) Byrnes subsp. viminalis, not indigenous, cultivated, naturalised, invasive

Metrosideros
Genus Metrosideros:
 Metrosideros angustifolia (L.) Sm. endemic
 Metrosideros excelsa Sol. ex Gaertn.  not indigenous, cultivated, naturalised, invasive
 Metrosideros tomentosa A.Rich. accepted as Metrosideros excelsa Sol. ex Gaertn.  not indigenous, naturalised

Myrtus
Genus Myrtus:
 Myrtus communis L. var. communis, not indigenous, naturalised

Psidium
Genus Psidium:
 Psidium cattleianum Sabine,  not indigenous, naturalised, invasive
 Psidium guajava L.  not indigenous, naturalised, invasive
 Psidium guineense Sw.  not indigenous, naturalised, invasive

Syncarpia
Genus Syncarpia:
 Syncarpia glomulifera (Sm.) Nied.  not indigenous, cultivated, naturalised

Syzygium
Genus Syzygium:
 Syzygium australe (J.C.Wendl. ex Link) B.Hyland,  not indigenous, cultivated, naturalised, invasive
 Syzygium cordatum Hochst. ex C.Krauss, indigenous
 Syzygium cordatum Hochst. ex C.Krauss subsp. cordatum, indigenous
 Syzygium cumini (L.) Skeels,  not indigenous, cultivated, naturalised, invasive
 Syzygium gerrardii (Harv. ex Hook.f.) Burtt Davy, indigenous
 Syzygium guineense (Willd.) DC. indigenous
 Syzygium guineense (Willd.) DC. subsp. barotsense F.White, indigenous
 Syzygium guineense (Willd.) DC. subsp. guineense, indigenous
 Syzygium intermedium Engl. & Brehmer, indigenous
 Syzygium jambos (L.) Alston,  not indigenous, naturalised, invasive
 Syzygium legatii Burtt Davy & Greenway, endemic
 Syzygium pondoense Engl. endemic

Oliniaceae
Family: Oliniaceae,

Cremastostemon
Genus Cremastostemon:
 Cremastostemon capensis Jacq. accepted as Olinia capensis (Jacq.) Klotzsch, indigenous

Olinia
Genus Olinia:
 Olinia acuminata Klotzsch, accepted as Olinia capensis (Jacq.) Klotzsch, indigenous
 Olinia capensis (Jacq.) Klotzsch, endemic
 Olinia cymosa (L.f.) Thunb. accepted as Olinia ventosa (L.) Cufod. indigenous
 Olinia cymosa (L.f.) Thunb. var. acuminata (Klotzsch) Sond. accepted as Olinia capensis (Jacq.) Klotzsch, indigenous
 Olinia cymosa (L.f.) Thunb. var. latifolia Sond. accepted as Olinia ventosa (L.) Cufod. indigenous
 Olinia emarginata Burtt Davy, indigenous
 Olinia huillensis Welw. ex A.Fern. & R.Fern. indigenous
 Olinia huillensis Welw. ex A.Fern. & R.Fern. subsp. burttdavii Sebola, endemic
 Olinia huillensis Welw. ex A.Fern. & R.Fern. subsp. huillensis, indigenous
 Olinia micrantha Decne. endemic
 Olinia radiata Hofmeyr & E.Phillips, endemic
 Olinia rochetiana A.Juss. indigenous
 Olinia ventosa (L.) Cufod. endemic

Onagraceae
Family: Onagraceae,

Epilobium
Genus Epilobium:
 Epilobium capense Buchinger ex Hochst. indigenous
 Epilobium hirsutum L. indigenous
 Epilobium karsteniae Compton, accepted as Epilobium capense Buchinger ex Hochst. 
 Epilobium salignum Hausskn. indigenous
 Epilobium tetragonum L. indigenous
 Epilobium tetragonum L. subsp. tetragonum, indigenous

Gaura
Genus Gaura:
 Gaura lindheimeri Engelm. & A.Gray, accepted as Oenothera lindheimeri (Engelm. & A.Gray) W.L.Wagner & Hoch,  not indigenous, naturalised
 Gaura sinuata Nutt. ex Ser. accepted as Oenothera sinuosa W.L.Wagner & Hoch,  not indigenous, naturalised
 Gaura sp. accepted as Oenothera sp.

Ludwigia
Genus Ludwigia:
 Ludwigia abyssinica A.Rich. indigenous
 Ludwigia adscendens (L.) Hara, indigenous
 Ludwigia adscendens (L.) Hara subsp. diffusa (Forssk.) P.H.Raven, indigenous
 Ludwigia leptocarpa (Nutt.) Hara, indigenous
 Ludwigia octovalvis (Jacq.) P.H.Raven, indigenous
 Ludwigia octovalvis (Jacq.) P.H.Raven subsp. brevisepala (Brenan) P.H.Raven, accepted as Ludwigia octovalvis (Jacq.) P.H.Raven,  present
 Ludwigia octovalvis (Jacq.) P.H.Raven subsp. sessiliflora (Micheli) P.H.Raven, accepted as Ludwigia octovalvis (Jacq.) P.H.Raven,  present
 Ludwigia palustris (L.) Elliott,  not indigenous, naturalised
 Ludwigia polycarpa Short & R.Peter ex Torr. & A.Gray,  not indigenous, naturalised
 Ludwigia stolonifera (Guill. & Perr.) P.H.Raven, accepted as Ludwigia adscendens (L.) Hara subsp. diffusa (Forssk.) P.H.Raven,  present

Oenothera
Genus Oenothera:
 Oenothera affinis Cambess.  not indigenous, naturalised, invasive
 Oenothera biennis L.  not indigenous, naturalised, invasive
 Oenothera drummondii Hook. subsp. drummondii, not indigenous, naturalised, invasive
 Oenothera erythrosepala (Borbas) Borbas, accepted as Oenothera glazioviana Micheli,  not indigenous, naturalised
 Oenothera glazioviana Micheli,  not indigenous, naturalised, invasive
 Oenothera grandiflora Aiton,  not indigenous, naturalised, invasive
 Oenothera indecora Cambess.  not indigenous, naturalised
 Oenothera indecora Cambess. subsp. bonariensis W.Dietr. accepted as Oenothera indecora Cambess.  not indigenous, naturalised
 Oenothera jamesii Torr. & A.Gray,  not indigenous, naturalised, invasive
 Oenothera laciniata Hill,  not indigenous, naturalised, invasive
 Oenothera lindheimeri (Engelm. & A.Gray) W.L.Wagner & Hoch,  not indigenous, naturalised, invasive
 Oenothera longiflora L. subsp. longiflora, not indigenous, naturalised, invasive
 Oenothera parodiana Munz,  not indigenous, naturalised, invasive
 Oenothera parviflora L.  not indigenous, naturalised, invasive
 Oenothera rosea L'Her. ex Aiton,  not indigenous, naturalised, invasive
 Oenothera sinuosa W.L.Wagner & Hoch,  not indigenous, naturalised, invasive
 Oenothera stricta Ledeb. ex Link subsp. stricta, not indigenous, naturalised, invasive
 Oenothera tetraptera Cav.  not indigenous, naturalised, invasive
 Oenothera villosa Thunb.  not indigenous, naturalised, invasive

Penaeaceae
Family: Penaeaceae,

Brachysiphon
Genus Brachysiphon:
 Brachysiphon acutus (Thunb.) A.Juss. endemic
 Brachysiphon fucatus (L.) Gilg, endemic
 Brachysiphon microphyllus Rourke, endemic
 Brachysiphon mundii Sond. endemic
 Brachysiphon rupestris Sond. endemic

Endonema
Genus Endonema:
 Endonema lateriflora (L.f.) Gilg, endemic
 Endonema retzioides Sond. endemic

Glischrocolla
Genus Glischrocolla:
 Glischrocolla formosa (Thunb.) R.Dahlgren, endemic

Penaea
Genus Penaea:
 Penaea acutifolia A.Juss. endemic
 Penaea cneorum Meerb. indigenous
 Penaea cneorum Meerb. subsp. cneorum, endemic
 Penaea cneorum Meerb. subsp. gigantea R.Dahlgren, endemic
 Penaea cneorum Meerb. subsp. lanceolata R.Dahlgren, endemic
 Penaea cneorum Meerb. subsp. ovata (Eckl. & Zeyh. ex A.DC.) R.Dahlgren, endemic
 Penaea cneorum Meerb. subsp. ruscifolia R.Dahlgren, endemic
 Penaea dahlgrenii Rourke, endemic
 Penaea mucronata L. endemic

Saltera
Genus Saltera:
 Saltera sarcocolla (L.) Bullock, endemic

Sonderothamnus
Genus Sonderothamnus:
 Sonderothamnus petraeus (W.F.Barker) R.Dahlgren, endemic
 Sonderothamnus speciosus (Sond.) R.Dahlgren, endemic

Stylapterus
Genus Stylapterus:
 Stylapterus barbatus A.Juss. endemic
 Stylapterus candolleanus (Steph.) R.Dahlgren, endemic
 Stylapterus dubius (Steph.) R.Dahlgren, endemic
 Stylapterus ericifolius (A.Juss.) R.Dahlgren, endemic
 Stylapterus ericoides A.Juss. indigenous
 Stylapterus ericoides A.Juss. subsp. ericoides, endemic
 Stylapterus ericoides A.Juss. subsp. pallidus R.Dahlgren, endemic
 Stylapterus fruticulosus (L.f.) A.Juss. endemic
 Stylapterus micranthus R.Dahlgren, endemic
 Stylapterus sulcatus R.Dahlgren, endemic

Rhynchocalycaceae
Family: Rhynchocalycaceae,

Rhynchocalyx
Genus Rhynchocalyx:
 Rhynchocalyx lawsonioides Oliv. endemic

References

South African plant biodiversity lists
Myrtales